Earls Barton Stadium (locally known as the pioneer sportsground) was a greyhound racing and speedway stadium on Station Road, south of Earls Barton and east of Northampton, Northamptonshire

Origins
The stadium was constructed in the 1940s on the east side of Station Road and north of a gravel pit and the River Nene

Greyhound racing
The greyhound racing was independent (not affiliated to the sports governing body the National Greyhound Racing Club). It was known as a flapping track which was the nickname given to independent tracks.

Racing took place on Monday and Thursday evenings on an all-grass circuit and race distances of 280, 470 and 680 yards behind an 'Inside Sumner' hare system. Facilities included a licensed club and bar and on course bookmakers.

Other Uses
The stadium was used for Speedway 1949–1957, Go Karting and Banger racing.Recently, it has been used as earls Barton United’s home ground and is now used as a child’s holiday football camp.

Closure
The stadium closed during the 1970s and the site is now football pitches called the Earls Barton Pioneer Sports Ground ( locally known ) mainly used by Earls Barton United FC. With 3 overlapping pitches.

References

Defunct greyhound racing venues in the United Kingdom
Defunct speedway venues in England
Stadium